Wapenamanda Rural LLG is a local-level government (LLG) of Enga Province, Papua New Guinea.

Wards
01. Awas
02. Tubiakores
03. Aipanda
04. Kaiamanda
05. Tombes
06. Yalis
07. Yuk
08. Alumbalam
09. Elyaganda
10. Takaipos
11. Mambisanda
12. Kumbas Kau
13. Wares
15. Rauanda
16. Pina
17. Yaibos
18. Topakapos
19. Paus
20. Kuimamanda
21. Kangarapos
22. Pompabus
23. Kanamanda
24. Mondop
25. Pausa
26. Kumbu
27. Yaramanda
28. Tapend
29. Yakaendis
30. Unda
31. Anji
32. Nanai
33. Walya
34. Ipia
82. Wapenamanda Urban

References

Local-level governments of Enga Province